Černí baroni may refer to:

 Černí baroni (book), a 1969 satirical novel written by Miloslav Švandrlík
 Černí baroni (film), a 1992 Czechoslovak comedy film
 Černí baroni (TV series), a Czech television series that aired in 2004